Fogg is a surname. Notable people with the name include:

People 
 Alan Fogg,
 Angus Fogg,
 B. J. Fogg, American psychologist and computer scientist
 Billy Fogg,
 Clarence J. Fogg,
 Dave Fogg,
 David Fogg,
 Daniel Fogg,
 E. Knowlton Fogg,
 Ellis D Fogg,
 Eric Fogg (1903–1939), English composer and conductor
 George G. Fogg (1813–1881), American diplomat and politician
 Gordon Elliott Fogg,
 Howard L. Fogg (1917–1996), American artist
 John Fogg (born 1944), American politician
 Josh Fogg (born 1976), American baseball pitcher
 Karen Fogg, British diplomat
 Kevin Fogg,
 Kirk Fogg, American game show host
 Kyle Fogg,
 Laurence Fogg,
 Martyn J. Fogg (born 1960), British physicist and terraforming researcher
 Mieczysław Fogg (1901–1990), Polish singer
 Mr. Fogg,
 Peter Fogg,
 Rodney D. Fogg,
 Ron Fogg,
 William Perry Fogg,

Fictional characters 
 Phileas Fogg, the protagonist of Jules Verne's Around the World in Eighty Days
 Madeline Fogg,  from Ludwig Bemelman's book series Madeline
 Marco Fogg, the protagonist of Paul Auster's novel Moon Palace